Ch'uch'u (Aymara for cold, cold liquid, also spelled Chuchu) is a mountain in the Andes of Bolivia, about  high. It is situated in the La Paz Department, Larecaja Province, Sorata Municipality. Ch'uch'u lies north of the main range of the Cordillera Real, north to northeast of the mountain Ch'uch'u Apachita. This is where the river Ch'uch'u Jawira originates.

See also 
 Llawi Imaña

References 

Mountains of La Paz Department (Bolivia)